Magdalena Szewczuk (born 13 April 2006)  is a Polish rhythmic gymnast, member of the national group.

Career 
She debuted into major competitions at the 2019 Junior World Championships in Moscow along Liwia Krzyzanowska, Anna Rybalko, Julia Wierzba, Oliwia Motyka-Radlowska and Julia Wojciechowska, placing 14th in the team competition, 11th in the group All-Around and 14th with 5 hoops. 

In 2022 Magdalena entered the national senior group, she debuted at the World Cup in Athens, winning bronze in the All-Around and with 3 ribbons and 2 balls and silver with 5 hoops. In May the group participated in the stage in Portimão winning bronze in the All-Around and with 3 ribbons and 2 balls and silver with 5 hoops. In June Magdalena and the group travelled to Pesaro, being 12th in the All-Around. Ten days later she competed at the 2022 European Championships in Tel Aviv, where Poland was 9th in the All-Around, 8th in the 5 hoops final and 10th with 3 ribbons + 2 balls. In September Szewczuk took part in the World Championships in Sofia along Milena Gorska, Liwia Krzyzanowska, Madoka Przybylska, Julia Wojciechowska and the individual Małgorzata Roszatycka, taking 13th place in the All-Around, 10th with 5 hoops and 14th with 3 ribbons + 2 balls.

References 

Living people
2006 births
Polish rhythmic gymnasts
People from Warsaw
Sportspeople from Warsaw